The Union Pacific North Line (UP-N) is a Metra line in the Chicago metropolitan area. It runs between Ogilvie Transportation Center and Kenosha, Wisconsin; however, most trains terminate in Waukegan, Illinois. Although Metra owns the rolling stock, the trains are operated and dispatched by the Union Pacific Railroad. This line was previously operated by the Chicago & North Western Railway before its merger with the Union Pacific Railroad, and was called the Chicago and North Western Milwaukee Division and then the Chicago & North Western/North Line before the C&NW was absorbed by Union Pacific in April 1995. It is the only Metra line that travels outside Illinois.

Metra does not refer to its lines by particular colors, but the timetable accents for the Union Pacific North line are dark "Flambeau Green," a nod to the C&NW's Flambeau 400 passenger train.)

On certain weekday trains, a private club car (#553, Deerpath,) runs exclusively on the Union Pacific North Line. It is now the only private commuter car in service in the United States.

The current timetable as of December 5, 2022 shows 70 trains (35 in each direction) on weekdays. Seven outbound trains terminate at Winnetka, five at Highland Park, 17 at Waukegan, and six at Kenosha.

13 trains operate in each direction on Saturdays. Of these, five inbound trains originate from Kenosha and eight from Waukegan. Six outbound trains terminate at Waukegan and seven at Kenosha.

Nine trains operate in each direction on Sundays. Of these, three inbound trains originate from Kenosha and six from Waukegan. Six outbound trains terminate at Waukegan and three at Kenosha.

History
The route followed by the UP North Line was constructed in 1854 by the Chicago & Milwaukee Railroad. Passenger service between Chicago and Waukegan began on January 4, 1855. Initially, a single train operated each day, departing from a terminal in Chicago at Water St. and Kinzie St. at 8:30 am and returning from Waukegan at 3:30 pm. The president of the railroad, former Chicago mayor Walter S. Gurnee, speculated on land in Lake County spurring the development of railway suburbs along the line. The railroad merged with the Green Bay, Milwaukee & Chicago Railroad in 1863, and was acquired by the Chicago and North Western Railway in 1866. Commuter rail services along the line started operating into the new Chicago and North Western Terminal (now Ogilvie Transportation Center) in 1911. In 1966, the Chicago and North Western closed the Lake Front Depot and began operating into the new Milwaukee Union Station. This service would ultimately prove to be relatively short lived as the Chicago and North Western ended operations between Chicago and Milwaukee in 1971 and the line was truncated to Kenosha. 

The North line became part of Metra when the agency was formed in 1984. The trains continued to be operated by the Chicago and North Western Railway under contract until that railroad was bought by Union Pacific in 1995. UP now operates passenger services along the line for Metra. Under a longstanding agreement that UP inherited from the C&NW, Metra owns the vehicles and the stations along the line, but Union Pacific employs the crew who actually operate the trains, and they also control the right-of-way along the route.

All stations on the line except for Ravinia Park are open daily. Ravinia Park is only open during the Ravinia Festival in the summer months.

Ridership
Between 2014 and 2019, annual ridership declined by 8.3% from 9,328,441 passengers to 8,552,117 passengers. Due to the COVID-19 pandemic, ridership dropped to 2,300,363 passengers in 2020.

Route
The service shares the Union Pacific Railroad's Harvard Subdivision with the Union Pacific Northwest Line from Ogilvie Transportation Center in downtown Chicago to a junction just before  station. From Clybourn, the North Line splits from the Northwest Line and traverses the Kenosha Subdivision north to Kenosha, Wisconsin. The Kenosha Subdivision continues to St. Francis, Wisconsin and a junction with the Union Pacific's Milwaukee Subdivision. No passenger trains operate north of Kenosha.

Stations

References

External links 

 Metra Union Pacific/North service schedule

Metra lines
Chicago and North Western Railway